The Universidad Autónoma de Asunción (Autonomous University of Asuncion) is a private university. It was founded in 1978 as the Escuela Superior de Administración de Empresas (Superior School of Business Administration). It obtained its title of university in 1991. As of  2006, it has 5000 students (undergraduate and graduate) and 350 professors.

The university comprises five colleges: 
 College of Law, Political and Social Sciences
 College of Science and Technology
 College of Economic Sciences and Administration
 College of Humanistic Sciences and Communication
 College of Health Sciences

References

External links
Official site 

Universities in Paraguay
Educational institutions established in 1978
1978 establishments in Paraguay